Hickam may refer to:

Surname
Homer Hickam (born 1943), American author, Vietnam veteran, and a former NASA engineer
October Sky: The Homer Hickam Story, 1999 American biographical film
Horace Meek Hickam (1885–1934), pioneer airpower advocate and officer in the United States Army Air Corps

Places
Hickam Air Force Base (formerly Hickam Field), United States Air Force installation
Hickam Housing, Hawaii, census-designated place in the City & County of Honolulu, Hawaii, United States

See also
Hick (disambiguation)
Hickman (disambiguation)
Whickham